A trefoil (three leaf) is a graphic form composed of three leaves or lobes.

Trefoil may also refer to:
 Clover, or trefoil, common names for plants of the genus Trifolium
 Trefoil Island, an island in Australia, part of Tasmania’s Trefoil Island Group
 Trefoil, Alberta, a locality in Special Area No. 2, Alberta, Canada
 Trefoil knot, the simplest example of a nontrivial knot
 Trefoil, a variation of the card game La Belle Lucie
 Trefoils, a variety of Girl Scout cookie
 Trefoil-class concrete barge, an American Type B ship

 , a Union Navy steamer

See also
 
 Quatrefoil (disambiguation) (four leaf)
 Cinquefoil (disambiguation) (five leaf)
 Lotus (genus), flowering plants that include species with common names including "trefoil"
 Trefoil Guild, part of Girlguiding 
 Vertical trefoil and oblique trefoil, Zernike polynomials
 Trefoil knot fold, a protein fold